Neodymium(III) fluoride is an inorganic chemical compound of neodymium and fluorine with the formula NdF3. It is a purplish pink colored solid with a high melting point.

Preparation

Like other lanthanide fluorides it is highly insoluble in water which allows it to be synthesised from aqueous neodymium nitrate via a reaction with hydrofluoric acid, from which it precipitates as a hydrate:

 Nd(NO3)3(aq) + 3 HF → NdF3•½H2O + 3 HNO3

It can also be obtained by the reaction of neodymium(III) oxide and hydrofluoric acid:

Nd2O3 + 6HF → 2NdF3 + 3H2O

Anhydrous material may be obtained by the simple drying of the hydrate, in contrast to the hydrates of other neodymium halides, which form mixed oxyhalides if heated.

Uses
Neodymium(III) fluoride is often used in the manufacture of fluoride glasses.

When neodymium is extracted from ores, the fluoride is often an intermediate product and is then reduced to the solid metal chemically (e.g. by adding calcium, which produces calcium fluoride) or by fused-salt electrolysis.

Other compounds
Neodymium(III) fluoride forms compounds with N2H4, such as NdF3•3N2H4•3H2O which is a white hexagonal crystal, soluble in water, slightly soluble in methanol and ethanol, with d20°C = 2.3547 g/cm3.

References

Neodymium compounds
Fluorides
Lanthanide halides